The Ephriam M. Baynard House is a historic home in Auburndale, Florida, located at 208 West Lake Avenue. On November 10, 2001, it was added to the U.S. National Register of Historic Places and houses the Baynard House Museum.

The Architect was Alfred Chipman Thorp, and Baynard's home was designed and built in the Folk Victorian style.

The house's namesake, Ephriam Mikell Baynard (1860-1933) was a real estate developer in the region. Baynard was designated a Great Floridian by the Florida Department of State in the Great Floridians 2000 Program. A plaque attesting the honor is located at the Baynard House.

Gallery

References

External links

 Florida's Office of Cultural and Historical Programs
 Baynard House Museum
 Great Floridians of Auburndale

Folk Victorian architecture in the United States
Houses on the National Register of Historic Places in Florida
National Register of Historic Places in Polk County, Florida
Houses in Polk County, Florida
Auburndale, Florida
1894 establishments in Florida
Houses completed in 1894